Walter Hardy is a fictional character appearing in American comic books published by Marvel Comics.

Publication history 
Created by writer Marv Wolfman and artist Keith Pollard, the character first appeared in The Amazing Spider-Man #194 (July 1979). He is a world-renowned cat burglar and the father of Felicia Hardy, a.k.a. Black Cat.

Fictional character biography 
Walter Hardy is a well-known cat burglar who got arrested at some point. Years later, the thief known as Black Cat steals precinct papers on the prison holding him. Peter Parker also conducted his own research, learning that Walter Hardy had been locked up in New York Prison for the past few decades and is now terminally ill. At the prison, Spider-Man fights Black Cat while her accomplices Boris Korpse and Bruno Grainger blast the wall to Walter Hardy's prison cell, the rubble of which buries Spider-Man.

With Spider-Man unable to get out of the rubble, the prison officers are unable to stop Black Cat, Korpse, and Grainger from making off with Walter Hardy. At his home, Black Cat reveals that she is his daughter, Felicia Hardy, and mentions that her mother Lydia purposefully hid his past from her. Walter then leaves to spend his final moments with his wife. After Black Cat falls into the river, Spider-Man goes to meet up with Lydia Hardy as she weeps over Walter's death.

At the time when Black Cat is in the hospital following Spider-Man's battle with Doctor Octopus, she claims to Peter Parker that she was visited by the ghost of Walter Hardy.

Powers and abilities 
The Cat had a miniature grappling hook device, which enables him to swing from buildings in a manner similar to Spider-Man, though not quite as fast. He could also use the cable from this device as a tightrope, wall scaling device, swing line, and/or as a weapon in combat. He had photographic memory as well.

Other versions 
The Ultimate Marvel version of the character is identified as Jack Hardy and is seen on a list of known cat burglars in the Daily Bugle database.

In other media

Television 

 The Cat appears in the Spider-Man episodes "The Cat" and "The Black Cat", voiced by John Phillip Law. This version's name is John Hardesky. As a boy, he was tricked by the Nazis into spying on Captain America's creation using his photographic memory. When Hardesky discovered the truth, he was hunted by a group sent by the Red Skull, but managed to evade them. Years later, he fell into protective S.H.I.E.L.D. custody until the Kingpin has the Chameleon replace him to get the super-soldier formula. Upon discovering it, the Kingpin tasks Doctor Octopus with kidnapping Hardesky's daughter Felicia Hardy to use as a test subject for the formula and transform her into the Black Cat. Spider-Man follows Black Cat to the Kingpin's hideout and rescues her and Hardesky after he destroys the super-soldier formula before it can be replicated. With the Kingpin's plan thwarted, Hardesky shares his goodbyes with his family and willingly returns to S.H.I.E.L.D. custody.
 Walter Hardy, amalgamated with the Burglar, appears in The Spectacular Spider-Man, voiced by Jim Cummings in the episode "Intervention" and by James Remar in the episode "Opening Night". In the former episode, a flashback accessed by the alien symbiote Parker was bonded to at the time depicts Spider-Man seeking revenge on a burglar who broke into his home and killed his Uncle Ben, only to discover he was the same robber he allowed to escape earlier that day. After Spider-Man subdues him, the burglar is arrested by the police. In the latter episode, Spider-Man discovers Hardy became an inmate of the Vault while testing the prison's security system and encountering Black Cat, who infiltrated the prison to break her father out. Amidst a prison break, Spider-Man recognizes Hardy as the burglar who killed Ben. Hardy expresses regret over taking the man's life and offers to make amends by staying behind to release knockout gas to subdue the other escaped inmates and allow Spider-Man and Black Cat to escape.

Video games 
Walter Hardy appears in Marvel's Spider-Mans "The Heist" DLC, voiced by Daniel Riordan. This version previously operated as the Black Cat years prior before he faked his death and his daughter Felicia Hardy took up the mantle. During a side quest, Spider-Man is contacted by NYPD Detective "Mackey", who tasks him with tracking down paintings stolen by Walter. As Spider-Man looks for them, Mackey relays Walter's backstory to him, explaining that because of his skill as a thief, the Maggia sought to recruit him. Walter refused and allowed himself to be arrested before supposedly drowning in a failed escape attempt from Ryker's Island, though many suspect that he faked his death to protect his family from the Maggia. After collecting all of the stolen art pieces, Spider-Man discovers that Mackey is actually Walter, who adopted an alias to retrieve all the stolen paintings and use them to finance his retirement. Before he leaves, Walter asks Spider-Man to look after Felicia.

References

External links 
 Walter Hardy at Marvel Wiki
 Walter Hardy at Comic Vine

Fictional professional thieves
Marvel Comics characters
Characters created by Keith Pollard
Characters created by Marv Wolfman
Comics characters introduced in 1979
Spider-Man characters